Manawatu  was a parliamentary electorate in the Manawatū-Whanganui region of New Zealand that existed during three periods between 1871 and 1996.

Population centres
The 1870 electoral redistribution was undertaken by a parliamentary select committee based on population data from the 1867 New Zealand census. Eight sub-committees were formed, with two members each making decisions for their own province; thus members set their own electorate boundaries. The number of electorates was increased from 61 to 72, and Manawatu was one of the new electorates.

History
The electorate existed during three periods: from 1871 to 1890, 1896 to 1911, and 1919 to 1996.

The first representative was Walter Woods Johnston, who was elected at the 1871 general election. He won the three subsequent general elections, and retired at the end of the parliamentary term in 1884. In the 1876 election, Johnston was challenged by the lawyer, naturalist and ornithologist Walter Buller.  The contest was close and Buller had a small majority in the district of two votes, but the voters from Wellington who were eligible to vote in the Manawatu and who made the arduous journey (the route was affected by recent flooding) to the nearest polling booth in Paikakariki gave Johnston the advantage. Johnston was succeeded by Douglas Hastings Macarthur in the 1884 general election. Macarthur held the electorate for two terms until 1890, when it was abolished. He successfully contested Rangitikei in the 1890 general election.

The electorate was recreated for the 1896 general election, when John Stevens got elected for the Liberal Party. He represented it until the 1902 general election, when he was defeated by Job Vile. Vile lost the electorate again at the 1905 general election to Stevens, who held it until 1908. In the 1908 general election, Stevens was defeated by the conservative politician Edward Newman in a second ballot. The electorate was abolished in 1911.

The electorate was recreated in for the 1919 general election, when John Stevens was once again successful. He held the electorate for one term. He was succeeded by Joseph Linklater in the 1922 general election. Linklater held the electorate for four parliamentary terms until 1935. In the 1935 general election, he was defeated by Labour's Lorrie Hunter, who held the electorate for one term.

Hunter lost the electorate in the 1938 general election to National's John Cobbe, who retired in 1943. He was succeeded by Matthew Oram until 1957.

Members of Parliament
Manawatu was represented by 16 Members of Parliament.

Key

Election results

1943 election

1938 election

1935 election

1931 election

1928 election

1899 election

Notes

References

Historical electorates of New Zealand
Politics of Manawatū-Whanganui
1870 establishments in New Zealand
1890 disestablishments in New Zealand
1911 disestablishments in New Zealand
1996 disestablishments in New Zealand
1896 establishments in New Zealand
1919 establishments in New Zealand
Manawatu District